The Valorugby Emilia, previously known as Rugby Reggio, is an Italian rugby union team based in Reggio nell'Emilia, in the Emilia-Romagna region. They currently play in the Top12, after gaining promotion from winning Serie A in the 2015–16 season. Established in Reggio nell'Emilia in 1970 like “Rugby Reggio A.S.D.”, since July 2018 it has changed its name to “Valorugby Emilia S.S.D.”

Honours
 Coppa Italia
 Champions (1): 2018–2019

Current squad

The squad for the 2022-23 Top10 season is:

Selected former players

Italian players
Former players who have played for the Emilian team and have caps for Italy:
 Cristian Bezzi
 Luca Bigi
 Roberto Mandelli
 Antonio Mannato
 David Odiete

Overseas players
Former players who have played for the Emilian team and have caps for their respective country:
 Gonzalo Garcia
 Florian Cazenave
 Matteo Dell'Acqua
 Karim Jammal
 Nico Wegner
 Silao Leaega
 Viliami Vaki
 Roland Suniula

References

External links
 Official website

Italian rugby union teams
Rugby clubs established in 1970
Province of Reggio Emilia
Emilia-Romagna